Mathews is an unincorporated community in Montgomery County, Alabama, United States, located  east-southeast of Montgomery. Mathews had a post office until it closed on November 19, 2011; it still has its own ZIP code, 36052. It was named for Revolutionary War hero and Georgia Governor George Mathews.

References

Unincorporated communities in Montgomery County, Alabama
Unincorporated communities in Alabama